Youi is an Australian insurance company. Its services cover vehicles, homes, product liability, and watercraft. Youi was founded in 2007 by its parent company OUTsurance and is headquartered in Queensland, Australia.

Overview
Youi was founded in 2007 by its parent company OUTsurance, making it the first African company to set up an insurance firm in Australia. OUTsurance is also a Rand Merchant Investment Holdings subsidiary, a South African investment holding company.

In 2014, OUTsurance launched Youi New Zealand as the subsidiary of Youi Australia. As of 2022, the company is headquartered in Queensland, Australia. In September 2019, Youi sold its 34,000 New Zealand policies to Tower.

Youi opened an office in Sydney in 2022.

The company provides insurance services and insurance products that include car insurance, home insurance, business liability, motorcycle insurance, caravan insurance, trailer insurance, and roadside assistance. in Australia and New Zealand.

Youi has over 100 APIs, which are used to integrate third-party systems. The APIs are run by Youi's Communication (Comms) team.

References

External links
Youi official website
Youi official twitter 
https://www.facebook.com/YOUI/
https://www.youtube.com/@Youi_Insurance
https://www.instagram.com/youi_insurance/

Insurance companies of Australia
Companies based in Queensland
Financial services companies established in 2007